Poleshchuk or Poleschuk is a Russian-language toponymic surname associated with Polissya and group of people Polishchuks who live in the Ukrainian-Belarus borderline. 

The surname may refer to:

Aleksandr Poleshchuk
Daniel Poleshchuk
Anton Poleschuk

See also
 
Polishchuk (surname)
Palaszczuk (surname)

Russian-language surnames